Der arme Teufel ("The Poor Devil") was a leading German-American anarchist magazine, published in German at Detroit, Michigan from 1884 to 1900, and edited mainly by the Detroit anarchist Robert Reitzel from 1884 until his death in 1898.

History 
The first two volumes of the magazine were mainly concerned with the freethought movement, and primarily consisted of articles on the subject of religious criticism. In issue # 583 (February 1, 1886), the editor, Robert Reitzel, declared that Der arme Teufel was now an anarchist publication. According to Max Nettlau, the magazine was "a treasure-trove of earnest and likable liberal and rebellious sentiments and thoughts, cutting-edge social critique and the shredding of Authority in all its forms, open and disguised." Half of the articles were abstracted from the magazines, Gesellschaft (Society), Zeit (Time), Die Zukunft (The Future), the Magazin für Literatur and the satirical journal Simplicissimus. Under the laws of the time issues 86, 88, 93, 100, 104 and 107 were suppressed. Articles on politics as well as literature were preferred. 822 issues were published over 16 volumes. After Reitzel's death in 1898, his friend Martin Drescher continued Der arme Teufel for two years; then followed it with the magazines Wolfsaugen, ein Blatt für freie Geister (Wolf's Eyes: A Paper for Free Spirits), appearing in 1900, and Der Zigeuner (The Gypsy) published at Chicago around 1902.

Contributors and Staff 
 Karl Henckell
 John Henry Mackay
 Christian Wagner
 Leo Tolstoy
 Adolf Ehrenberg
 Franz Held
 Edward Fern
 George Herwegh

Other Anarchist Periodicals of the Same Name 
 Der arme Teufel, published by Albert Weidner and edited by Erich Mühsam. Appeared from 1902 to 1904.
 Der arme Teufel, appearing in Nordböhmen (Austria). 1906 to ?
 Der arme Teufel, a local newspaper in Ludwigshafen by the Freie Arbeiter-Union Deutschlands (FAUD). Appeared from around 1930 to ?

References

 Ulrike Heider, Der arme Teufel. Robert Reitzel – Vom Vormärz zum Haymarket. Elster-Verlag 1986. 
 Oliver Benjamin Hemmerle, Der arme Teufel. Eine transatlantische Zeitschrift zwischen Arbeiterbewegung und bildungsbürgerlichem Kulturtransfer um 1900. Münster: LIT-Verlag 2002. 
 Rudolf Rocker, Johann Most. Das Leben eines Rebellen. Der arme Teufel (Detroit), Pages 379-381. Berlin 1924/25. Neuauflage: Libertad Verlag, Berlin und Köln 1994. 
 Hartmut Rübner, Freiheit und Brot. Die Freie Arbeiter-Union Deutschlands. Der arme Teufel (Ludwigshafen), Seite 283. Libertad Verlag, Potsdam 1994.

External links 
 In the Bibliothek der Freien
 Information on Der arme Teufel (Detroit) and Der arme Teufel (Berlin) in Datenbank des deutschsprachigen Anarchismus (DadA, Database of German-language Anarchism).
 In the catalog of the Deutschen Nationalbibliothek

Anarchist periodicals published in the United States
Defunct political magazines published in the United States
Defunct magazines published in the United States
Magazines established in 1884
Magazines disestablished in 1900
Magazines published in Detroit
German-language magazines